Shahpur is a medium size village in Phillaur tehsil of Jalandhar District of Punjab State, India. It is located 7.7 km away from Goraya, 41 km from Jalandhar and 122 km from state capital Chandigarh. Shahpur has postal head office in Phillaur which is 11 km away from the village. The village is administrated by Sarpanch who is the elected representative of village.

Caste 
The village has schedule caste (SC) constitutes 54.01% of total population of the village and it doesn't have any Schedule Tribe (ST) population.

Education 
The village has a Punjabi Medium, Co-educational Upper Primary school (GMS Shahpur School). The school provide mid-day meal as per Indian Midday Meal Scheme and the meal prepared in school premises. The school was founded in 1954.

Colleges 
Below is the list of college/institutes in Shahpur:
Ct Institute Of Pharmaceutical Sciences
M.k. College Of Education

Transport

Rail 
Phillaur Junction is the nearest train station however, Bhatian Railway Station is 4 km away from the village.

Air 
The nearest domestic airport is located 38 km away in Ludhiana and the nearest international airport is located in Chandigarh also Sri Guru Ram Dass Jee International Airport is the second nearest airport which is 136 km away in Amritsar.

References 

Villages in Jalandhar district
Villages in Phillaur tehsil